Daniel D. Kelley (born 1970) is the former Iowa State Representative from the 29th District.  He has served in the Iowa House of Representatives from 2011-2017.  Kelley was born in Marshalltown, Iowa and was raised and resides in Newton.  He has a B.A. with honors in communication studies from the University of Iowa.

In 2022 he unsuccessfully ran in the Republican primary for the 46th district.

References

External links

 

1970 births
Date of birth missing (living people)
Living people
University of Iowa alumni
Members of the Iowa House of Representatives
People from Newton, Iowa
Politicians from Marshalltown, Iowa
Iowa Democrats
21st-century American politicians
Iowa Republicans